Paluvelupula is a village in Hanamkonda mandal, Hanamkonda district, Telangana.

References

Villages in Hanamkonda district